King Jǐng of Zhou,, personal name  Ji Gui, was the twenty-fourth king of the Chinese Zhou dynasty and the twelfth of Eastern Zhou.  He succeeded to the throne after the death of King Ling of Zhou. King Jǐng reigned from 544 BC to 520 BC. The country was in financial ruin during King Jǐng's reign and supplies had to be bought from neighbouring states. He died in 520 BC of a disease and he was briefly succeeded by his son, King Dao of Zhou.

Family
Queens:
 Queen Mu (d. 527 BC), the mother of Crown Prince Shou

Concubines:
 The mother of Crown Prince Meng and Prince Gai

Sons:
 First son, Prince Chao (d. 505 BC), fled to Chu in 516 BC
 Crown Prince Shou (d. 527 BC)
 Crown Prince Meng (d. 520 BC), ruled as King Dao of Zhou in 520 BC
 Prince Gai (d. 477 BC), ruled as King Jìng of Zhou from 519–477 BC

Ancestry

See also
Family tree of ancient Chinese emperors

520 BC deaths
Zhou dynasty kings
6th-century BC Chinese monarchs
Year of birth unknown